John Maver (born 1932) is an Australian pianist and composer.

Maver was born in Sydney, where he studied the piano: first under Miss Purcell of Botany Bay, then with Kathleen Horne and Ramsay Pennycuick. As a student of the NSW Conservatorium of Music, he studied piano with the noted pianist/composer Frank Hutchens (a pupil of Tobias Matthay), and composition with Raymond Hanson. In Sydney, he performed on radio 2CH, gave recitals and taught before sailing for London in 1968.

Since then, he has given a wide range of concerts, including the Wimbledon Summer Festival, Leighton House, and a much-publicised 1981 Royal Wedding Day concert at St. Martin-within-Ludgate.

He is one of the very few composer-pianists on the circuit today. In addition to a wide repertoire of neo-classical music and virtuoso Romantic music, he has established a considerable reputation with the performances of his own compositions, as well as his own poetry (Albion Enigma) and he has presented concerts of extemporised keyboard work.
He has worked with Ballet Rambert, the Royal Ballet, Arts Educational Schools and the mime artists Adam Darius and Nathaniel. He was also Musical Director of the International Arts Centre—participating in an American production (Pantomime) of Hansel and Gretel.

Maver returned to Australia for two years' sojourn, where he continued to give recitals, most notably for the Polish-Australian Cultural Society (which was filmed) and performances at the Sydney Opera House with the Australian Ballet and the English dancer Maina Gielgud for a television film Frozen Music He also appeared in the Sydney Spectacular for the Australian Broadcasting Commission. At the same time he made himself known as an actor—appearing in TV. Series, commercials, and feature films—chief among which have been Bodyline, The Last Bastion playing opposite Timothy West, Land of Hope, and Burke and Wills-in the role of conductor (an operatic sequence with Greta Scacchi).

Returning to Britain in 1986, Maver resumed his career with a performance of his Toccata Australis, a substantial work which has been well praised by many international pianists including Vladimir Horowitz, Nelson Freire, and Shura Cherkassky. This work was first performed in Britain by Alan Brown. The American virtuoso pianist Janice Weber has praised several of Maver's compositions as "Very Horowitzian"; an Étude for the Left Hand Alone as "Very effective. Sounds as difficult as it is."  He has recorded a programme of Bach, Beethoven, Chopin and Franz Liszt, in addition to his own compositions and extemporisations.

An unpublished novel has been completed, he has established himself as a photographer in the casual style and has exhibited a collection of photos charting the rebuilding of part of the Arts Educational Schools (theatre) in Chiswick.  Recently a London photo agency has accepted some of his photographic work to be included in their catalogue. Photographs have featured in the local press, Musical Theatre Pantomime Programmes, Spotlight, C.D record Covers, and the Kyoto Gardens Exhibition portfolio.

He is related to Sir Harry Lauder, the Scots baritone, music hall singer and composer.
(Previously, J.B. Maver has worked at various hospitals, Sydney / London, as an anaesthetic technician, and a phlebotomist.)

Maver compositions for piano 
Etude No. 1 in C Sharp Minor, 1985.
Etude No. 2 in C Sharp Minor, 1987.
Tzigane Etude, 1988.
Etude. For the Left Hand Alone, 1992.
Toccata "Australis", 1983.
Soiree de Vienne, 1985.
Die Fledermaus Johann Strauss, Concert Transcription, John Maver
Soiree de Madison Square Garden
Concert arrangement of The Stars Stripes Forever (John Philip Sousa) / John Maver, 1985
Paraphrase on a Prelude''' (Prelude op.43 no.1 Reinhold Gliere), John Maver, 1996.
Encore Etude/ John Maver, 1995.Hungarian Dance no.7 (Johannes Brahms), Concert Transcription, John Maver, 1996.Sabre Dance (Aram Khachaturian), Concert Transcription/ John Maver, 1997.Carmen Etude(Gypsy Song, Act 2, Carmen (Georges Bizet), Concert Transcription, John Maver, 1997.
 Wiegenlied (song) Richard StraussLullaby—Bereceuse, op 40(a) no.1Piano Solo Arrangement/ John Maver, 1997.Paganini EtudeEight variations on Caprice no.24, Niccolò Paganini, 2000.
5 Easy pieces (For Children), 1974.
Indian and Soldier.
The Tortoise.
Two Cuckoos (Basis for Toccata 'Australis').
Rain.
Valse.
5 Pieces for Ballet, 1968.
Valse Lente.
George Street Rag.
Minor march.
Little Mephisto Waltz.
Melodie.
Serenade (Franz Schubert), piano Solo Version, John Maver, Bagatelle, 2000.
 Caprice-Etude, 2001.
I got Rhythm (George Gershwin), Concert Transcription/ John Maver, 2002.
Deep Purple (Song) Billy de Rose, arrangement, John Maver, 2002.
Toccata, 2003. from (Australis), original version with extra Cadenza, John Maver.
 Botany Bay Waltz/ John Maver, 2004.
 Toccata-Etude, John Maver, 2004.Boogie Etude, John Maver, 2004.Little Mephisto Waltz. John Maver, 2004.Rimsky-Etude 2009Paganini-Etude 2010Turkish March-Beethoven/Arrangement John Maver 2010Carmen Encore, John Maver 2011''

External links
– John Boswell Maver's Photographic Works 
– John Boswell Maver's Website 
– John Boswell Maver on ARCHIVE.ORG 

1932 births
Living people
Australian male composers
Australian composers
Sydney Conservatorium of Music alumni